Eric Millegan (born August 25, 1974) is an American actor, best known for his role as Dr. Zack Addy on the Fox series Bones.

Early life
Millegan was born in Hackettstown, New Jersey, and raised in Springfield, Oregon. He attended Springfield High School, where he was student body vice president his senior year. He studied acting at the Interlochen Arts Camp at Interlochen Center for the Arts before studying musical theater at the University of Michigan, where he received a Bachelor of Fine Arts degree.

Personal life
Millegan is gay. Out magazine named him the "Hottest Up-and-Coming Openly Gay Actor of 2003."

In March 2010, Millegan came out as having bipolar disorder in The Huffington Post.

Millegan married his long-time partner, Charles Michel, in New York City on June 28, 2012.  He announced his union on Twitter.

On November 1, 2015, Millegan ran in the TCS New York City Marathon.

Filmography

Film

Television

Theatre

References

External links

 
 
 

1974 births
Living people
American male musical theatre actors
American male television actors
American gay actors
American gay musicians
Male actors from New Jersey
Male actors from Oregon
University of Michigan School of Music, Theatre & Dance alumni
People from Springfield, Oregon
People from Warren County, New Jersey
LGBT people from New Jersey
LGBT people from Oregon
People with bipolar disorder
20th-century American LGBT people
21st-century American LGBT people